Alejandro Mariñelarena Mutiloa is a former Grand Prix motorcycle racer from Spain. He was forced to retire from racing after a serious crash on Circuit Paul Ricard.

Career statistics

By season

Races by year
(key)

References

External links

1992 births
Living people
Spanish motorcycle racers
Moto2 World Championship riders